

A

A